Brock Matheson (born May 28, 1987) is a Canadian former professional ice hockey player.

Born in Gananoque, Ontario, Matheson played junior hockey in Ottawa with the Kanata Stallions. Matheson then played with the Union College Dutchmen until 2011. At the end of the 2010–11 season, he made his professional debut with two games with the Binghamton Senators. The following season, Matheson played with the Stockton Thunder of the ECHL and a few games with the Rochester Americans. He then left North America to play for the Belfast Giants in the Elite Ice Hockey League. In 2013, he signed with the Friesland Flyers of Netherlands' Eredivisie league.

References

External links

Canadian ice hockey defencemen
Belfast Giants players
Stockton Thunder players
Binghamton Senators players
1987 births
Living people
Canadian expatriate ice hockey players in the Netherlands
Canadian expatriate ice hockey players in Northern Ireland
Canadian expatriate ice hockey players in the United States
Ice hockey people from Ontario
People from Leeds and Grenville United Counties